Acrocordiella is a genus of fungi in the family Pyrenulaceae. It was in the family Requienellaceae.

Species
As accepted by Species Fungorum;
Acrocordiella occulta 
Acrocordiella omanensis  
Acrocordiella photiniicola  Requienellaceae
Acrocordiella yunnanensis  Requienellaceae

References

Pyrenulales
Eurotiomycetes genera